Tiina Tauraite (born on 2 June 1976 in Tallinn) is an Estonian actress.

In 1998 she graduated from the Estonian Academy of Music and Theatre. Since then, she has worked as a theatre actress at Von Krahl Theatre. Besides theatre roles she has appeared in a number of films (most notably The Temptation of St. Tony (2009), Autumn Ball (2007) and the 2016 film The Spy and the Poet) and television series (Elu keset linna (2012) and Screwed in Tallinn in 1999).

Besides her native Estonian, Tauraite is fluent in English, Russian and Finnish.

Filmography

 2008: Sügisball 
 2009: The Temptation of St. Tony
 2011: Idioot
 2016: Kala-kala 
 2016: Luuraja ja luuletaja
 2018: Omad
2019: Colours in Black & White
 2019: Virago
2020: Teene
2020: My Dear Corpses
 2021: Sandra saab tööd

Television 

 2018: Lõks
 2018: Pank

Awards 
Tauraite has received three Estonian Theatre Awards. In 2008 she was awarded for her work as supporting actor in "Seagull", as Best Supporting Actor in the 2012 production "Dona Rosita The Spinster" and a Special Award for her one-woman show "Tiina Tauraite's Tractor."

References

Living people
1976 births
Estonian stage actresses
Estonian film actresses
Estonian television actresses
21st-century Estonian actresses
Estonian Academy of Music and Theatre alumni
Actresses from Tallinn

 https://www.imdb.com/name/nm1008259/
 https://www.tiinatauraite.com/